Air Marshal Michael Samson-Oje (born 5 January 1954) was a senior commander in the Ghana Air Force and the Ghanaian Chief of Defence Staff between 2016 and 2017. Prior to that he was Chief of Air Staff.  Before his appointment as Air Force chief, Samson-Oje was Station Commander of Takoradi Air Base.

External links
Ghana Armed Forces - Profile of Air Vice Marshal Michael Samson-Oje

1954 births
Ghana Air Force air marshals
Living people
Tamale Senior High School alumni